Maun is the fifth-largest town in Botswana. As of 2011, it had a population of 55,784. Maun is the "tourism capital" of Botswana and the administrative centre of Ngamiland district. Francistown and Maun are linked by the A3 highway. It is also the headquarters of numerous safari and air-charter operations who run trips into the Okavango Delta.

Although officially still a village, Maun has developed rapidly from a rural frontier town and has spread along the Thamalakane River. It now has shopping centres, hotels and lodges as well as car hire, although it retains a rural atmosphere and local tribesmen continue to bring their cattle to Maun to sell. The community is distributed along the wide banks of the Thamalakane River where red lechwe can still be seen grazing next to local donkeys, goats and cattle.

History 

The settlement was founded in 1915 as the tribal capital of the Batawana people, it has had a reputation as a hard-living 'Wild West' town helping the local cattle ranching and hunting operations. However, with the growth of the tourism industry and the completion of the tar road from Nata in the early 1990s, Maun has developed swiftly, losing much of its old town character. It is now home to over 55,000 people.

Maun is today a thriving tourist town, infamous for its infestation of donkeys and to a lesser extent goats. These animals can be seen standing around town as the local farmers arrive in the innumerable taxis to sell their wares on the curbside.

With the influx of tourism dollars, the typical traditional rondavels have been replaced by square, cinderblock homes roofed with tin and occasionally tiles.

Maun is also becoming a regional transshipment hub for materials and tradespeople who service both the local camps and safari centres and the burgeoning mineral exploration camps in northwestern Botswana. There are a wide variety of services in stores as well as many local entrepreneurs with welding ventures operated from the back of a cart.

Tourists often fly into the Maun International Airport.  Often, these tourists hire fully equipped 4x4 cars for camping and game viewing in the parks, or otherwise fly to several tourist camps in the Okavango Delta or the Makgadikgadi.

Maun, like most areas in southern Africa, has a protracted aviation history.

Climate 
Maun has a hot semi-arid climate (Köppen climate classification BSh).

Etymology and logistics 
The name Maun is derived from the Seyei word 'maung', which translates 'the place of river reeds'. Before the arrival of Batawana Maun was a small Yei village. The village in 1915 became the capital for the Batawana people. The capital was transferred from Toteng after victory over Ndebele King Lobengula.

In a broader sense Maun is a gateway for exploring much of northern Botswana; for example it is the natural hub for visitors from outside the region to explore the Tsodilo Hills and the Makgadikgadi Pans. The Thamalakane River discharges to the Boteti River, whose seasonal high flow reaches the Makgadikgadi.

Commercial development 

In 2011, Maun had branches of Barclays Bank, First National Bank Botswana, Stanbic Bank and Standard Chartered Bank with ATM facility.
Maun has three main hotels; Sedia Riverside Hotel, Riley's Hotel and Maun Lodge. There are many other accommodations and campsites, oriented towards the safari business like Okavango River Lodge, Thamalakane Lodge, the old Bridge Backpackers and others.

Education 
Maun Senior Secondary School is located in Maun.

Healthcare
The Letsholathe II Memorial Hospital is the main referral hospital in Maun. There is also Maun Private Hospital, located on Sedia road, which opened its door to public from July 2021.

Sports 
Maun also hosts the Sankoyo Bush Bucks, a football (soccer) team promoted to the Botswana Premier League in 2013-14.

In popular culture 
The Top Gear: Botswana Special (episode 4 of series 10), which aired in 2007, includes segments in Maun.

The sixth and seventh legs of the 22nd installment of the American television program The Amazing Race took place in and around Maun.

The music video for "Am I Wrong" by Nico & Vinz, was filmed in Maun, as well as in Victoria Falls, Zimbabwe.

The 2012 TV series Bush Pilots was filmed in Maun.

References

External links 
 
 
The Ngami Times, Maun's weekly newspaper
 Maun Local History

Populated places in Botswana
District capitals in Botswana
North-West District (Botswana)
Kalahari Desert